Julian Creus (30 June 1917 – 9 September 1992) was a British weightlifter.

Career
Creus was born in Liverpool on 30 June 1917. His father, Barcelona-born Julio José Pedro Creus, had been killed two months earlier on 21 April when the ship on which he was serving, S.S. Pontiac, was attacked by a U-Boat. The Commonwealth War Graves record shows that at the time the family were living at 59 Kent Street in the Toxteth area of Liverpool. He competed for Great Britain in the 1948 Summer Olympics held in London in the bantamweight event where he finished in second place. He competed at both the 1952 Summer Olympics in Helsinki and 1956 Summer Olympics in Melbourne both at featherweight finishing ninth and equal eleventh respectively.

He represented England and won a silver medal in the 60 kg division at the 1950 British Empire Games in Auckland, New Zealand.

References

1917 births
1992 deaths
Sportspeople from Liverpool
English male weightlifters
Olympic weightlifters of Great Britain
Olympic silver medallists for Great Britain
Weightlifters at the 1948 Summer Olympics
Weightlifters at the 1952 Summer Olympics
Weightlifters at the 1956 Summer Olympics
Olympic medalists in weightlifting
Weightlifters at the 1950 British Empire Games
Commonwealth Games silver medallists for England
Medalists at the 1948 Summer Olympics
Commonwealth Games medallists in weightlifting
20th-century English people
Medallists at the 1950 British Empire Games